Timothy Banks is an American illustrator and author recognized by Society of Illustrators Los Angeles, Spectrum, 3×3 Magazine, Creative Quarterly, PLAY! Illustration and Showcase 100. His clients include Nike, Paste Magazine, Egmont, Faber & Faber, and Nickelodeon. He has illustrated dozens of children’s books, including a reimagining of the Wizard of Oz  for young readers, There's A Norseman in the Classroom and the classic Enid Blyton series, The Five Finder Outer, for Egmont UK. His illustrations for Nian, The Chinese New Year Dragon, released in 2020, help garner a "Reviewer's Choice" Award from Feathered Quill. He has done extensive work for TOWN and Paste Magazine, including Paste's "The Failure Issue" named one of 2015's best covers by min. Also, Banks's work was selected to be the official image for Piccolo Spoleto 2014. In 2017, Banks wrote and published the illustrated anthology, Monsters In Charleston, depicting whimsical monsters taking over his hometown of Charleston, SC.

Honors and awards 
Banks is the recipient of numerous honors and awards:

 2020, Gold Medal for Editorial Illustration, Society of Illustrators Los Angeles
2020, Feathered Quill Reviewer's Choice Award, Nian, The Chinese New Year Dragon
 2018, 3x3 Picture Books Show Winner
 2018, American Marketing Award for Illustration
 2014, 2018 200 Best Illustrators Worldwide
 Creative Quarterly 36 Winner

References

External links

Timothy Banks' Hire An Illustrator Portfolio
Instagram Account
Egmont UK - Five Find-Outer Mystery Volumes

American illustrators
Living people
Year of birth missing (living people)
Artists represented by Shannon Associates